I Loved You, is a 1968 Soviet comedy film directed by Ilia Frez and written by Mikhail Lvovsky. Produced by the Gorky Film Studio, it premiered on 29 January 1968 and, with 21,3 million viewers, became one of the Soviet box office leaders of that year.

The film was internationally popular in Eastern Europe. The film's topic was awakening romantic feelings in a group of Russian teenagers.

Plot summary
15-year-old Kolya Golikov falls in love with Nadya Naumchenko, an aspiring teenage ballet dancer and a Choreography school student. Infatuated, he goes out of his way to impress her, among other things by perfume, cigarettes and his peculiar style of dancing too. Utter ridiculousness of his ways notwithstanding, Nadya seems to like the boy. Over-excited during the night walk, as the two approach the place she lives in, Kolya starts to behave towards her somewhat acquisitively. Taken aback, the girl declares herself to be totally disillusioned with him. "You do not seem interesting to me, not anymore!" she exclaims. Weeks pass. And Kolya, who's always been good at mathematics but bad at learning poems by heart, is so shattered by this fiasco as to impress his school examiners with passionate recital of "I Loved You...", Pushkin's famous paean to unrequited love.

Autumn comes and it's time for the older boy, Zhora, to be conscripted. He decides to spend his last evening together with his friends and takes them all to the concert in the local theatre. There Kolya sees Nadya dancing on stage. He is awe-struck and enchanted again. Minutes later, behind the curtains Nadya learns about Zhora's company being there in the audience. "And... is Kolya there too?" she can't help asking, leaving the finale open.

Cast
Viktor Perevalov as Kolya
Violetta Khusnulova as Nadya
Valeri Ryzhakov as Zhora		
Natalya Seleznyova as Lidia Nikolayevna, teacher of literature
Yevgeniy Vesnik as father
Vera Orlova as mother
Natalia Dudinskaya as Zoya Pavlovna, ballet teacher

References

External links

1968 films
1968 comedy films
1960s teen comedy films
Russian teen comedy films
Films directed by Ilya Frez
Soviet teen comedy films
1960s Russian-language films